University of Chitral is public sector university in Chitral, Khyber Pakhtunkhwa, Pakistan. The university is run by the provincial government and founded in 2017.

Overview and history 

University of Chitral is established by Government of Khyber Pakhtunkhwa in District Chitral in 2017. It is created as result of Higher Education, Archives and Libraries Department Khyber Pakhtunkhwa notification number SO(UE-II)3-1/2017 dated March 31, 2017.

Before inception of University of Chitral, there were two university campuses operating in district Chitra. Shaheed Benazir Bhutto University, Sheringal subcampus and Abdul Wali Khan University subcampus. The student number in these campuses were growing over period of time resulting in the provision of academic facilities had also increased manifolds. The present academic, research and residential facilities were not enough to cater for the actual requirements of all the students. The situation thus warranted the construction and development of a full-fledged University at Chitral in order to meet the present and expected high demand for higher educational facilities for students. The residents of Chitral were also demanding a full-fledged University for Chitral from quite sometimes. This results in the creation of University of Chitral in 2011.

University of Chitral will act as a "regional education corridor" for Pakistan, Afghanistan, Central Asia via Wakhan Strip, Gilgit Baltistan and Gilgit-Chitral, Dir, Malakand alternate CPEC Route. It will enable the region to promote development through creation of job opportunities, advance skills provision, leading to accelerated economic growth and poverty reduction. While making regional connectivity, competitiveness and trade, this university will create a knowledge platform so that all national, regional and continental stakeholders may connect, collaborate and jointly work to produce world class human resources to make this ambitious plan successful. This university will play important role in Vision 2025 and Five Year Plan 2008–13, balanced development agenda of the Planning Commission, Government of Pakistan.

Departments
The university currently has the following Departments.

 Department of Botany
 Department of Computer Science
 Department of Economics
 Department of Education
 Department of English Language & Literature
 Department of Management Sciences
 Department of Political Science
 Department of Sociology
 Department of Tourism and Hotel Management
 Department of Urdu
 Department of Zoology

See also 
 Shaheed Benazir Bhutto University, Sheringal
 Abdul Wali Khan University
 University of Malakand, Chakdara
 University of Buner

References

Public universities and colleges in Khyber Pakhtunkhwa
Educational institutions established in 2017
2017 establishments in Pakistan
Chitral District